Thato Matlebyane (born 1995), professionally known as Thato Saul is a South African rapper and songwriter who rose to fame subsequent to the release of "Never Ride" by Mashbeatz after the single went viral on a video sharing platform TikTok.

In 2022 Matlebyane received a total of six nominations from the South African Hip Hop Awards of which he won three out of six nominations. He was named the best freshman and newcomer. He made a guest appearance on the posthumous studio album MASS COUNTRY by AKA with a song titled "Mbuzi (Freesyle)" which left fans and listeners asking "who is Thato Saul?".

Awards and nominations

References

Notelist

External links 

 

1995 births
Living people
South African record producers
South African musicians
People from Gauteng
South African rappers
Sotho people
21st-century rappers
21st-century South African musicians